The right to the city is an idea and a slogan first proposed by Henri Lefebvre in his 1968 book . This idea has been taken up more recently by social movements, thinkers, and certain progressive local authorities as a call to action to reclaim the city as a co-created space: a place for life detached from the growing effects that commodification and capitalism are proposed to have had over social interaction and the rise of posited spatial inequalities in worldwide cities throughout the last two centuries.

Overview 

In his first inception of the concept, Lefebvre paid specific emphasis on the effects that capitalism had over “the city”, whereby urban life was downgraded into a commodity, social interaction became increasingly uprooted and urban space and governance were turned into exclusive goods. In opposition to this trend, Lefebvre raised a call to “rescue the citizen as main element and protagonist of the city that he himself had built” and to transform urban space into “a meeting point for building collective life”.

Due to the inequalities produced by the rapid increase of the world urban population in most regions of the world, the concept of the right to the city has been recalled on several occasions since the publication of Lefebvre’s book as a call to action by social movements and grassroots organizations. In their appeal for “their right to the city”, local mobilizations around the world usually refer to their struggle for social justice and dignified access to urban life to face growing urban inequalities (especially in large metropolitan areas). The right to the city has had a particular influence in Latin America and Europe, where social movements have particularly appealed to the concept in their actions and promoted local instruments for advancing its concrete understanding in terms of policy-making at the local and even national level. A good proof on how the notion of right to the city has gained international recognition in the last years could be seen in the United Nations’ Habitat III process, and how the New Urban Agenda (2016) recognized the concept as the vision of “cities for all”.

Lefebvre summarizes the idea as a "demand...[for] a transformed and renewed access to urban life". David Harvey described it as follows:

Recent popular movements 

A number of popular movements, such as the shack dwellers' movement Abahlali baseMjondolo in South Africa, the Right to the City Alliance in the United States, Recht auf Stadt, a network of squatters, tenants and artists in Hamburg, and various movements in Asia and Latin America, have incorporated the idea of the right to the city into their struggles.

In Brazil the 2001 City Statute wrote the Right to the City into federal law.

More recently, scholars have proposed a 'Digital Right to the City', which involves thinking about the city as not just bricks and mortar, but also digital code and information.

Migrants' and refugees' right to the city 

Last year, inspired by the migrants' and refugees' squats in the center of the cities (like Athens refugee squats and other european cities) created a renewed interest on the right to the city. According to Tsavdaroglou and Kaika (2021) in the case of Athens "the refugees’ practices for collective production of alternative housing (e.g. clandestine squats) share many characteristics in common with what Lefebvre identified as claiming the right to the city: namely, freedom and socialisation, appropriation against private property, habitation. Claiming freedom, many of the refugees refuse to accept the spaces allocated to them in state-run camps at the city’s outskirts as their living spaces, and relocate to the city centre. In search of alternative forms of habitation, they enact appropriation against private property institutions and practices, which often take the form of squats of abandoned buildings in the city centre in collaboration with local solidarity groups. Once occupied, these buildings become novel forms of habitation with strong elements of commoning and cohabitation. Hundreds of newcomers experiment with these forms of co-living and togetherness, often together with local and European activists. Apart from meeting housing needs, these housing forms become significant tools for refugees to participate in the urban social and political life. Therefore, though precarious, vulnerable and ephemeral, these new forms of cohabitation produced by refugees claim a right to the city; they act, ‘cry and demand’ (Lefebvre, 1996 [1968]: 173) freedom of movement, appropriation of housing, cohabitation and collective participation in a ‘renewed urban life’ (Lefebvre, 1996 [1968]: 158). Given these characteristics, we argue that the Lefebvrian concept of the right to the city is most appropriate for understanding and explaining the refugees’ self-organised housing practices."

Women's right to the city 

The urban form of cities is gendered, and feminist scholars  have argued that the right to the city needs to be understood in gendered terms. For instance in São Paulo, one in every three women over the age of 16 has experienced some sort of sexual violence.

Criticism 
The growing popularity of the concept has nonetheless raised some criticism and concerns on how the original vision of Henri Lefevbre could be reduced to a “citizenship vision”, focused on the mere implementation of social and economic rights in the city leaving aside its transformatory nature and the concept of social conflict behind the original concept. Marcelo Lopes de Souza has for instance argued that as the right to the city has become "fashionable these days", "the price of this has often been the trivialisation and corruption of Lefebvre's concept" and called for fidelity to the original radical meaning of the idea.

See also 
 Human Rights City
 Progressivism

References

Further reading

External links
 World Charter for the Right to the City (PDF)z
 World Charter for the Right to the City (HTML)
 Proposal for a Charter for Women's Right to the City
 Proposals and Experiencies towards the Right to the City, Ana Sugranyes and Charlotte Mathivet (editors) 03-16-2010

Political philosophy
Urban planning
Equality rights